Xie Mengyu is a Chinese freestyle wrestler. She won one of the bronze medals in the 55kg event at the 2022 World Wrestling Championships held in Belgrade, Serbia. She won the gold medal in her event at the 2019 Asian Wrestling Championships held in Xi'an, China.

She competed in the 55kg event at the 2019 World Wrestling Championships held in Nur-Sultan, Kazakhstan. She was eliminated in her first match by eventual bronze medalist Olga Khoroshavtseva of Russia.

She won one of the bronze medals in her event at the 2023 Ibrahim Moustafa Tournament held in Alexandria, Egypt.

Achievements

References

External links 
 

Living people
Year of birth missing (living people)
Place of birth missing (living people)
Chinese female sport wrestlers
Asian Wrestling Championships medalists
World Wrestling Championships medalists
21st-century Chinese women